Vestskogen is an area on the island of Nøtterøy, in Nøtterøy municipality, Norway. It is located on the north-eastern side of the island and forms part of the urban area of Tønsberg. Vestskogen has 1847 inhabitants (2010).

References

Villages in Vestfold og Telemark
Nøtterøy